Petr "Pekka" Milonoff (born 22 February 1947 in Helsinki) is a Finnish theatre- and film director and an actor of Russian, German and Swedish ancestry. His sons Juho (born 1974) and Eero (born 1980) are also actors. Juho's twin brother Tuomas works with lights, electricity and filming in TV sets.

References

External links
 

1947 births
Living people
Male actors from Helsinki
Finnish film directors
Finnish people of Russian descent
Finnish people of Swedish descent
Finnish people of German descent
Finnish people of German-Russian descent